This is a list of defunct airlines of Singapore.

See also
 List of airlines of Singapore
 List of airports in Singapore

References

Singapore
Airlines
Airlines, defunct